Al-Madina is an Arabic local newspaper, printed weekly in tabloid format, published and distributed for free in Israel.

History 
Al-Madina appears in two editions. One edition is published in Haifa and distributed in the north of Israel in 15,000 copies since 2004. Its editor-in-chief is Firas Khatib. Until 2006, the editor-in-chief was Ala Hlehel, an Arab-Israeli writer and two-time winner of the A. M. Qattan Foundation Literature Awards. The other
edition is published in Tel Aviv, with 12,000 copies distributed throughout central Israel since 2006. The editor-in-chief is Ghaleb Kiwan, who is also a news reporter for Arabic-language broadcasts on the Israeli cable provider HOT.

In addition to international, national and local news coverage, the paper publishes opinion pieces and articles on health, sports, arts and culture.

See also 
Newspapers in Israel
Palestinians
Arab citizens of Israel

References

External links 
Official website

Arab Israeli culture in Haifa
Arabic-language newspapers published in Israel
Weekly newspapers published in Israel
Newspapers established in 2004
Mass media in Tel Aviv
Mass media in Haifa
2004 establishments in Israel
Free newspapers